Karydomys is a genus of fossil Eurasian hamster-like rodents in the subfamily Democricetodontinae from the Langhian stage in the middle Miocene epoch.

Species
 Karydomys boskosi, C.D. Theocharopoulos 2000, found in Greece
   Karydomys debruijni, found in China 
 Karydomys dzerzhinskii, Kordikova & De Bruijn, 2001, found in Kazakhstan 
 Karydomys symeonidisi
 Karydomys wigharti, found in Germany 
 Karydomys zapfei

References

Cricetidae
Miocene rodents
Miocene mammals of Europe
Fossil taxa described in 2000